Jerome Dingwall (born 16 January 1989) is a Seychellois football goalkeeper who plays for Red Star FC. He was a squad member for the 2017 and 2018 COSAFA Cups.

References 

1989 births
Living people
Seychellois footballers
The Lions FC players
Red Star FC (Seychelles) players
Seychelles international footballers
Association football goalkeepers